Aphrophora quadrinotata, the four-spotted spittlebug, is a species of spittlebug in the family Aphrophoridae. It is found in North America.

References

Further reading

External links

Articles created by Qbugbot
Insects described in 1831
Aphrophoridae